Stand Up Guys is a 2012 American black comedy crime film directed by Fisher Stevens and starring Al Pacino, Christopher Walken, and Alan Arkin. The film was released in North America on February 1, 2013. "Stand up guy" is an American phrase meaning a loyal and reliable friend.

Plot
Doc (Christopher Walken) picks up his old friend Val (Al Pacino) from prison. At Doc's apartment, while Val is in the bathroom, Doc approaches him with a gun but does nothing. They go for coffee and Val says he wants to "party". They go to a brothel but Val cannot perform, so Doc and Val break into a pharmacy and steal several bottles of drugs. Val overdoses on Viagra, has sex with a prostitute named Oxana and they go to a club. Val takes some of the other drugs to get a buzz. Two thugs approach them for no apparent reason and they leave. Val passes out in the car and Doc considers killing him again, but takes him to the hospital.

The nurse they see is Nina Hirsch (Julianna Margulies), the daughter of their old friend Richard (Alan Arkin), who tells them he lives in a retirement home. Thereafter, they go to a local diner where Val correctly guesses that Doc is to kill him. Doc says he has been given until 10 a.m. to do the job, or else he will be killed as well. Outside, they steal a car and pick up Richard, who had once been their getaway driver. Richard gets behind the wheel and into a highway chase with the police. When Richard desires his first threesome, they go back to the brothel to fulfill his wish, though he feels guilty about it despite being a widower.

After they leave, they find a naked woman named Sylvia in their trunk, who was kidnapped and raped by a group of men and tells them where they are. Val and Doc go inside and subdue the kidnappers. After tying everyone up, Sylvia comes in with a baseball bat for her revenge. Back at the car, Doc and Val find that Richard has died. They break the news to Nina, who helps the two bury her father at the cemetery. Doc and Val return to the diner, where the young waitress is revealed to be Doc's granddaughter Alex. Doc makes a phone call to Claphands, who had ordered him to kill Val. Though Doc begs him to show Val mercy, Claphands reveals that he knows about Alex, and threatens to hurt her unless Doc completes the job.

Doc writes a letter to Alex, puts his apartment keys inside the envelope, then pins it to the wall of the diner. Walking down the street at sunrise, Val spots a church and he goes inside to give a priest his confession. Next, they break into a tailor shop, where they try on suits. The two thugs who approached them at the club the night before and are working for Claphands interrupt them, pestering Doc to kill Val. Doc and Val shoot and wound them both. They both put on new suits and prepare to face the reality of the situation.

Alex enters Doc's apartment and looks around. Doc calls her from a payphone and tells her the sunrise paintings were inspired by her and has her retrieve a shoebox full of cash which he saved for her future. He tells her he loves her but that she might not see him for a while. Doc and Val walk down the street; Doc cannot bring himself to kill Val, so they decide to go kill Claphands. They open fire on his men and his warehouse and the camera pans over to the sunrise which Doc painted.

Cast
 Al Pacino as Val
 Christopher Walken as "Doc"
 Alan Arkin as Richard Hirsch
 Julianna Margulies as Nina Hirsch
 Mark Margolis as "Claphands"
 Lucy Punch as Wendy
 Addison Timlin as Alex
 Vanessa Ferlito as Sylvia
 Katheryn Winnick as Oxana
 Bill Burr as Larry

Release
The film premiered at the Chicago International Film Festival on October 12, 2012, and was shown next at the Mill Valley Film Festival.

Reception
The film has received mostly mixed reviews: , it holds a 36% rating on review aggregator Rotten Tomatoes based on 107 critics with a weighted average of 5.17/10. The website's critics consensus reads: "Stand Up Guys largely wastes its talented cast in a resolutely mediocre comedy hampered by messy direction and a perfunctory script." Slant Magazine gave the film two and a half stars out of four:

Watching Christopher Walken, Al Pacino, and Alan Arkin sitting in a diner, talking about the old days, produces a certain kind of frisson, a comforting familiarity that springs from their collective decades of on-screen myth-making. Conversely, though, there's a profound sense of despair that stems from seeing the man who played Michael Corleone lying on a hospital bed with a pup-tent erection, leering at his doctor in a scene that feels ripped from a sub-Apatow VOD knockoff. Your mileage with Stand Up Guys will depend on how much despair you're willing to endure in order to get to the worthwhile stuff—scenes in which the rookie filmmakers get out of the way and let the veteran actors play off of each other.

Owen Gleiberman gave the film a grade of B−, and concluded the following:

Directing his first dramatic feature, Fisher Stevens does his best to give these gravel-voiced legends room to strut their stuff. But that's the problem: The movie is too much of a wide-eyed, ramshackle homage to '70s-acting-class indulgence. It needed much more shape and snap. Still, when Alan Arkin joins the party as a dying colleague, his antics—at least once he gets behind the wheel of a stolen car—give the film a fuel injection. Stand Up Guys reminds you that these three are still way too good to collapse into shticky self-parody, even when they're in a movie that's practically begging them to.

Roger Ebert of the Chicago Sun-Times enjoyed the film, giving it three and a half stars out of four, saying: "Apart from any objective ranking of the actors, Walken is a spice in any screenplay, and in 'Stand Up Guys,' there's room for at least as much spice as goulash. Director Fisher Stevens begins with a permissive screenplay by Noah Haidle that exists in no particular city, for no particular reason other than to give the actors the pleasure of riffing through more or less standard set-pieces."

Mick LaSalle of the San Francisco Chronicle gave the film one of its most glowing reviews, saying it contains the "best performance[s] in years" by both Pacino and Walken; as LaSalle puts it, the film is "difficult to talk about. Say it's a movie about old gangsters, and you immediately imagine the other person thinking, 'It's sentimental.' Mention a scene in which the old gangsters show up at a brothel, and a whole other set of cliches come to mind. But Stand Up Guys is different. It introduces standard movie tropes only to subvert them and broaden them and bring out their truth."

At the 70th Golden Globe Awards, the film was nominated for a Best Original Song for "Not Running Anymore" by Jon Bon Jovi.

See also 
Other crime caper films involving older perpetrators include:

Going in Style
Tough Guys

References

External links
 
 
 
 
 

2012 films
2010s crime comedy films
2012 crime thriller films
American crime thriller films
American crime comedy films
Films about old age
2010s English-language films
Films shot in Los Angeles
Lakeshore Entertainment films
Lionsgate films
Sidney Kimmel Entertainment films
Films produced by Sidney Kimmel
Films produced by Gary Lucchesi
Roadside Attractions films
Films directed by Fisher Stevens
2012 comedy films
Films scored by Lyle Workman
2010s American films